Cadae is an experimental Western poetry form similar to the Fib.  While the Fib is based on the Fibonacci sequence, the cadae is based on the number pi.  The word "cadae" is the alphabetical equivalent of the first five digits of pi, 3.1415.

The form of a cadae is based on pi on two levels.  There are five stanzas, with 3, 1, 4, 1, and 5 lines each, respectively for a total of fourteen lines in the poem.  Each line of the poem also contains an appropriate number of syllables.  The first line has three syllables, the second has one, the third has four, and so on, following the sequence of pi as it extends infinitely. 

Rachel Hommel wrote an untitled "Cadaeic Cadae", which uses the cadae form as explained above, and adds a level of complexity to it wherein the number of letters in each word represents a digit of pi. 

Michael Keith wrote a "Cadaeic Cadenza", called "Near a Raven" in the Cadenza poetry form (also sometimes called Cadence), where the number of letters in each word represents a digit of pi.

For his book, "The Burning Door," Tony Leuzzi wrote a series of 33 untitled poems in cadae form.

References

Stanzaic form
Genres of poetry